The 1990 Eisenhower Trophy took place 25 to 28 October at the Christchurch Golf Club near Christchurch, New Zealand. It was the 17th World Amateur Team Championship for the Eisenhower Trophy. The tournament was a 72-hole stroke play team event with 33 four-man teams. The best three scores for each round counted towards the team total.

Sweden won the Eisenhower Trophy for the first time, finishing 13 strokes ahead of the joint silver medalists, New Zealand and United States with Canada, France and Japan tied for fourth place. Mathias Grönberg had the lowest individual score, 2-under-par 286, six strokes better than fellow-Swede Gabriel Hjertstedt.

Teams
33 teams contested the event. Each team had four players with the exception of team Brazil who only had three.

Scores

Source:

Individual leaders
There was no official recognition for the lowest individual scores.

Source:

References

External links
Record Book on International Golf Federation website 

Eisenhower Trophy
Golf tournaments in New Zealand
Eisenhower Trophy
Eisenhower Trophy
Eisenhower Trophy